Gullible's Travels may refer to:
Gullible's Travels (Brobdingnagian Bards album), 2000
Gullible's Travels (Rehab album), 2012
Gullible's Travels, a 1917 book by Ring Lardner
"Gullible's Travels", a song by Soul Asylum from their 1990 album And the Horse They Rode In On
Gullible's Travels, a 2000 recording by Marc Gunn
Gullible's Travels, a 2002 novel by Matt Hughes
Gullible's Travels, a book by Cash Peters
Gullible's Travels, a book by Billy Connolly
Gullible's Travels, a screenplay by Ron J. Friedman and Steve Bencich